The American Medical Group Association (AMGA) is a non-profit trade association headquartered in Alexandria, Virginia. AMGA represents the interests of multi-specialty medical groups and integrated health systems in the United States.

History 
AMGA (originally a group practice association, later named as American Group Practice Association, and further named as AMGA), was founded in 1950 with the intention to uniformly represent the interests of physicians working in group practice settings. In 1974, the association was renamed the American Group Practice Association. In 1996, this group merged with the Unified Medical Group Association to form the American Medical Group Association. In 2016, the American Medical Group Association was re-branded as "AMGA," and a tagline was added, “Advancing High Performing Health."

AMGA Consulting 
AMGA Consulting is a professional services firm that provides consulting and advisory services to independent and health-system-affiliated medical groups within the United States. It is a for-profit organization that operates independently from the association.

AMGA Consulting publishes numerous annual surveys, including the Medical Group Compensation and Productivity Survey, which analyze compensation and productivity trends of physicians and advanced practice providers working in a medical group setting.

Political Advocacy 
AMGA majorly advocates on behalf of its members at the federal level. Policy issues AMGA has focused on include:

 Transition to value-based care
 Improving PQRM
 Improving MACRA, MIPS, and APM
 Improving Medicare Advantage
 Access to capital
 Combating the opioid epidemic
 Accountable Care Organizations
 Preservation of the ability to provide advanced diagnostic imaging services
 Strengthening graduate medical education

Diabetes: Together 2 Goal Campaign 
Together 2 Goal was a three-year, national campaign created by the AMGA Foundation, with the goal of measurably improving the outcome of care for patients in the United States with type 2 diabetes, by 2019. Over 100 medical groups, non-profits, health systems, and corporations, including the American Diabetes Association, American Association of Diabetes Educators, Novo Nordisk, Inc., and Geisinger Health participated in this campaign.

Group Practice Journal 
Group Practice Journal (GPJ) is a healthcare-based professional trade magazine, publishing six times each year. GPJ focuses on the topics of practice management, business operations, executive leadership, public policy, information technology & cybersecurity and finance. GPJ relies heavily on crowd-sourced content.

Council of Accountable Physician Practices (CAPP) 
The Council of Accountable Physician Practices (CAPP) is a non-profit think tank affiliated with AMGA Foundation. CAPP conducts market research to understand how a medical group organizational model affects healthcare outcomes. The findings of CAPP's research showcase a strongly favorable disposition towards the accountable care model.

See also 

 Managed Care
 Group Medical practice in the United States
 Integrated Care

References 

Medical associations based in the United States
Non-profit organizations based in Alexandria, Virginia
1950 establishments in Virginia
Organizations established in 1950